Springbank Hill is a large and diverse suburb near the western city limit of Calgary, Alberta in the southwest (SW) quadrant. It is bounded to the north by 17 Avenue SW, to the south by Stoney Trail, to the east by 69 Street SW and to the west by 101 Street SW.

Springbank Hill is sometimes confused with the much older unincorporated rural community of Springbank, located to the west of the city in Rocky View County. The Springbank Hill area was once the eastern portion of Springbank. Springbank Hill was established in 1999, on land annexed to the City of Calgary in 1994. The community association was formed in 2001.

The community of Springbank Hill is made up of numerous subdivisions, including Springborough, Summit of Montreux, Springbank Hill, The Slopes, Anatapi and Spring Valley.

Springbank Hill is home to Ernest Manning High School, which commenced classes in September 2011, and Ambrose University College. The 69 Street station of the West LRT (which began operations on December 10, 2012), is also located in Springbank Hill.

Demographics

According to 2006 Census of Canada, residents in this community had a median household income of $116,470 in 2005, and there were 6.7% low income residents living in the neighbourhood. 42.6% of the population aged 15 and over were university educated. In 2006, 87.2% of the buildings were single detached housing, 6.0% were semi-detached, and 6.5% were row houses and apartments.  3.4% of the housing was used for renting.

Climate

See also
List of neighbourhoods in Calgary

References

External links
Springbank Hill Community Association

Neighbourhoods in Calgary